Zaur is a given name. Notable people with the name include:

Zaur Ardzinba (1950–2015), businessman from Abkhazia who unsuccessfully ran for President in the 2009 election
Zaur Gashimov (born 1981), Azerbaijani football defender
Zaur Gurbanli (born 1987), youth activist, co-founder and ex-board member of N!DA Civic Movement
Zaur Hashimov (born 1981), football defender from Azerbaijan
Zaur Kaloev (born 1931), Georgian footballer
Zaur Kaziev (born 1983), Russian footballer
Zaur Khapov (born 1964), retired football goalkeeper who won two international caps for Russia in 1994
Zaur Kuramagomedov (born 1988), Avar–Balkar wrestler who won a bronze medal at the 2012 Summer Olympics
Zaur Mamutov (born 1980), Ukrainian–Russian football player
Zaur Osmayev (born 1986), Russian professional football player
Zaur Pachulia (born 1984), Georgian professional basketball player
Zaur Pashayev (born 1982), Azerbaijani judoka
Qari Zaur Rahman, citizen of Afghanistan reported to be a leader of the Taliban's leadership
Zaur Ramazanov (born 1976), Azerbaijani footballer striker
Zaur Sadayev (born 1989), Russian football player of Chechen origin
Zaur Tagizade (born 1979), retired Azerbaijani footballer
Zaur Tedeyev (born 1981), Russian professional football coach and a former player

See also
Artush and Zaur, novel by Azerbaijani writer and journalist Ali Akbar (alias of Alakbar Aliyev) published in 2009
Jan Zaur or Jan Zaor, Polish baroque architect from Kraków who was active from 1638 to 1676
Zarur (disambiguation)